WBWC (88.3 FM) – branded 88.3 FM The Sting – is a non-commercial educational college/alternative rock radio station licensed to Berea, Ohio, serving western parts of Greater Cleveland.  Owned by Baldwin Wallace University, the station is operated by both faculty and students.  The WBWC studios are located at Strosacker Hall on the Baldwin Wallace campus in Berea, while the station transmitter resides in North Olmsted.

History
WBWC signed on as the first totally student funded and operated radio station in the United States on March 1, 1958.  Stereo facilities were added to the radio station in 1975.  By 1981, WBWC received permission from the FCC to begin construction to increase broadcast power from 10 to 100 watts of power.  That same year, the station launched the Summer Marathon Series.  In 1995, WBWC became the very first college radio station to perform a remote broadcast from the Rock and Roll Hall of Fame in Cleveland.  The station's power was increased to 4,000 watts in 2001.  Seven years later, on March 1, 2008, WBWC celebrated its 50th Anniversary.

Current programming
WBWC airs 24 hours of modern rock every day.  During weekday overnights, the station airs a variety of music styles.  On Sunday evening, the station airs The Golden Age of Rock and Roll and Sunday Night at the Oldies. Public Service to the community includes news via the Associated Press.  During the summer months, WBWC airs the weekly Summer Marathon Series: every Thursday, the station features 18 hours of music centered on a particular artist or theme.

References

External links

1958 establishments in Ohio
Baldwin Wallace University
BWC
Modern rock radio stations in the United States
Radio stations established in 1958
BWC